Blaž Lorković (29 January 1839 – 17 February 1892) was a Croatian economist, lawyer, political and cultural worker, and the founder of Croatian political economy. Because of his contributions, the Republic of Croatia named its Order of Danica Hrvatska for business and economics after him.

Biography
Lorković was born in Jarče Polje near Karlovac in a rural family as the only child of Pavao and Julka Lorković. In 1851 he attends high school in Varaždin where he was noticed and in 1854 with the help and persuasion of his uncle, the parish priest in the village Rasinja near Koprivnice, he moved to Zagreb. He was located at the Episcopal orphanage. After completing high school education in October 1857 Lorković goest to clergy and enters the archdiocese seminary, deciding for priest's call to satisfy his parents and uncle. During the stay in the seminary he edited some literary magazines, and fought against germanization. He left the seminary on 17 February 1862. In October 1863 he entered as a regular student into the University of Zagreb Faculty of Law. He passed all the exams in regular period with highest grades. In July 1867 Lorković successfully finished his four-year study of law science.

On 16 December 1871 Lorković became a teacher at the Royal Juridical Academy. He replaces his belletristic work with scientific and educational at the Juridical Academy and similar associations.

The most important Lorković's scientific work is Počela političke ekonomije ili nauke obćega gospodarstva, which was published by Matica hrvatska in 1889 in the context of a series of publications for the Croatian dealers.

He served as a rector of the University of Zagreb in the academic year 1883/1884.

He died in Zagreb.

His son Ivan Lorković and grandson Mladen Lorković were also influential politicians.

Work
Scientific works:
 Počela političke ekonomije ili nauke obćega gospodarstva - most important work
 Razgovori o narodnom gospodarstvu
 Kakvo bijaše gospodarsko stanje Hrvatske u 18. stoljeću, kakove su narodno-gospodarske ideje tada vladale i kakvi bijahu zastupnici tih ideja (report)
 Sadanje stanje gospodarske nauke (report)

He published his literary works in popular magazines Vienac and Naše gore list:
 Ljubav i vjernost (short story)
 Nekoliko tajnih listića (short story)
 Sliepac (novella)
 Nevjera (short story)
 Putne sgode i nesgode (itinerary)
 Ples (novella)
 Pod kruškom (novelette)
 Iznimke (short story)
 Posrednik (short story)
 Pisanice (short story)
 Prekasno (short story)
 Kažnjena taština
 Mejdan na moru (novella)
 Izpoviest (novel)
 Otac i kći (short story)
 Prošlost i sadašnjost
 Hrvati i Srbi (article)

Notes

References
 Lorković's biography, at the University of Zagreb website
 Biography

1839 births
1892 deaths
People from Netretić
19th-century Croatian economists
Croatian lawyers
Faculty of Law, University of Zagreb alumni
Rectors of the University of Zagreb
Burials at Mirogoj Cemetery
Members of the Croatian Academy of Sciences and Arts